The 1990–91 Irish League Cup (known as the Roadferry Freight League Cup for sponsorship reasons) was the fifth edition of Northern Ireland's secondary football knock-out cup competition. It concluded on 13 March 1991 with the final.

Glenavon were the defending champions after defeating Newry Town 3–1 in the previous final. This season however, they went out in the second round with a defeat to Larne. Glentoran became the first club to win the trophy more than once, after the first four competitions were won by four clubs. They defeated Ards 2–0 in the final.

First round

|}

Second round

|}

Quarter-finals

|}

Semi-finals

|}

Final

References

Lea
1990–91 domestic association football cups
1990–91